The Miners River is a river on the Upper Peninsula of Michigan in the United States. It is the largest river in the Pictured Rocks National Lakeshore. Miners River has its origin outside of the National Lakeshore, north of Indian Town in the Hiawatha National Forest, and flows  into Lake Superior. Miners Lake and Miners Falls are found along the river. The river empties into Lake Superior at the western end of Miners Beach. It is popular for tourism and fishing.

See also
List of rivers of Michigan

References

Michigan  Streamflow Data from the USGS
MyFishmaps.com

Rivers of Michigan
Pictured Rocks National Lakeshore
Rivers of Alger County, Michigan
Tributaries of Lake Superior